Dollar is a surname. Notable people with the surname include:

Aubrey Dollar (born 1980), American actress
Bill Dollar (1950–1996), American radio host
Cameron Dollar (born 1975), American basketball player and coach
Caroline Dollar (born 1983), American actress
Charles M. Dollar, expert on the management of electronic records
Creflo Dollar (born 1962), American televangelist
Jonny Dollar (1922–1986), American country and rockabilly singer, songwriter and guitarist
Jonny Dollar (1964–2009), English record producer and songwriter
Matt Dollar (born 1977), American politician
Mladen Dolar (born 1951), Slovene philosopher
Nelson Dollar (born 1961), American politician
Robert Dollar (1844–1932), Scottish-born lumber baron, shipping magnate and philanthropist
Sarway Dollar (born 1988), Sierra Leonean footballer
William Dollar (1907–1986), American ballet dancer
Beau Dollar, stage name of soul vocalist and drummer William Hargis Bowman Jr. (1941–2011)

Scottish surnames
German-language surnames
Americanized surnames